Adelphicos sargii, Sargi's earth snake, is a colubrid snake found in Mexico and Guatemala.

References

Adelphicos
Reptiles of Mexico
Reptiles of Guatemala
Reptiles described in 1885
Taxa named by Johann Gustav Fischer